The 21st Infantry Regiment, Queen Sirikit's Guard (ร.21 รอ.) is an elite force King's Guard regiment under the 2nd Infantry Division, Queen Sirikit's Guard of the Royal Thai Army. They are trained like special operations forces. The regiment was created in 1950. It is known as the Queen's Guard or Thahan Suea Rachini (translated as "Queen's Tiger Soldiers"). It is sometimes referred to as the "Eastern Tigers". The regiment is based in Chonburi.

Origins

The 1st Infantry Battalion of the 21st Regimental Combat Team was formed on 22 September 1950 by the regent, Rangsit Prayurasakdi, under executive of Prime Minister Plaek Phibunsongkhram, at the request of United Nations Command. Its purpose was to help the US-led UN troops fight the Korean People's Army and the Chinese People's Volunteers in the Korean War. Keeping the justice and the peace of the world was the founding mission of this order. After the war, on 1 August 1955, the group was transferred into Bangkok area.

On 1 August 1959, it changed a status to the 1st Infantry Battalion of 21st Infantry Regiment, Queen Sirikit's Guard, and on 31 July 1968, moved the base to the Fort Nawamintharachini at Chonburi Province. On 1 October 2011, its unit strength changed from a three infantry battalion to a one mechanized infantry battalion and two elites infantry battalion.

Campaigns
 Korean War service called "Little Tigers" in Battle of Pork Chop Hill. They received 12 Silver Stars, 1 Aircraft Order of Merit, and 26 Bronze Star Medals. 
 Voluntary service in the Vietnam War in 1968-1969 Called the "Queen's Cobra".
 Suppressed communist terrorists and helped civilians in Nan Province in 1975.
 Received the Order of Rama for stopping Vietnamese border incursions on the Thai-Cambodian border in 1983.

Organization

The regiment is composed of three subordinate units: the 1st, 2nd, and 3rd Infantry Battalions.

1st Infantry Battalion, 21st Infantry Regiment, Queen's Guard

2nd Infantry Battalion, 21st Infantry Regiment, Queen's Guard

3rd Infantry Battalion, 21st Infantry Regiment, Queen's Guard

Uniform
 Rajchawanlop hat with black tuft with the royal cypher of the queen.
 Purple woolen top with black woolen mane embroidered with the queen's cypher on the wrist.
 Black woolen trousers with two purple stripes per side.

Training

Selection
Trainee must be serve in the 21st Regiment Queen's Guard or be permitted by the Royal Thai Army to attend the training.

Training content
The Queen's Tigers run a training course every two years. Its duration is 23 weeks.
 Physical and mental conditioning in preparation for the next phase (5 weeks): This phase focuses on basic abseiling, bomb disposal, counterterrorism, fast tactical shooting, first aid, intelligence collection, marksmanship, parachuting, small unit, tactical diving, and use a map and compass. Hand and Arm Signals. Hand-to-hand combat. Learn the languages of neighboring countries. NBCR on operations in contaminated environments. Physical exercises. Swimming. Only those who passing this phase move to the next phase.
 Forest and mountain training (4 weeks): This phase focuses on infiltration by air and ground. Abseiling, counter-ambushes, exfil, forward observer, guerrilla warfare, infiltrate the area with a helicopter, jungle warfare, living off the jungle, mountain warfare, raiding tactics, reconnaissance tactics, riding a horse, small unit tactics, tactical emergency medical services, tracking tactics, use a map and compass, and unconventional tactics.
 Sea phase (3 weeks): Water infiltration and tactical diving. Amphibious reconnaissance, amphibious warfare, coastal patrolling, helocasting, living off the sea, parachuting into water, and underwater diving.
 Urban phase (5 weeks):  Characteristics and choice of explosives and the amount and mode of use to minimize collateral damage, climbing in different situations using ropes, combat and patrolling techniques in urban areas, counterterrorism, CQB and CQC, fast-roping, hostage rescue, reconnaissance in urban areas, tactical shooting the PPC, tactical use of motorbikes, urban warfare, usage of explosives in the presence of hostages, use of explosives and other techniques for breaking doors, and use ladders climbing.
 Air phase (6 weeks): Parachuting, parachute packing and problem solving.

Award for completion
Those who successfully complete the tiger training course receive a military capabilities plate from the queen. The metal plate is decorated with a purple heart and the queen's cypher. The lower part is a blue ribbon contain the honorific "Tiger Soldier". To both sides of the purple heart are tigers soaring above mountains, waves, and clouds.

Missions
Collect intelligence in a special gathering manner.
Counter-sabotage and riot control.
Counterterrorism and hostage rescue.
Create masses in the infiltration area.
Operating behind enemy lines.
Protection of The Royal Family and VIP.
Spearheaded the combat in battlefield.
Suppress insurgents in all terrains by infiltrating air, land, and water.

Political influence
In the 1990s, according to one academic, "...the Eastern Tigers amassed considerable wealth by trading gems with Cambodian Khmer Rouge insurgents based along the two countries' border, a racket which 'directly benefited'... some of its commanders. Within a decade, the Eastern Tigers dominated the Thai military." The Queen's Guard have since had an inordinate influence on Thai politics. Former Queen's Guard commanders led the May 2014 Thai coup d'état that toppled the elected government.

Thai military junta , leader of the 2014 Thai coup d'état, Thai Prime Minister Prayut Chan-o-cha also started his military career at 21st Infantry Regiment in 1990, which is granted Royal Guards status as the Queen's Guards. In 2002, Prayut served as a deputy commanding general in the 2nd Infantry Division, becoming its commanding general one year later.

See also
Thailand in the Korean War
Prayut Chan-o-cha

References

External links
 Official Website of the 1st Infantry Battalion, 21st Infantry Regiment, Queen's Guard

King's Guard units of Thailand
Military units and formations established in 1950
1950 establishments in Thailand